Venturi Transport Protocol (VTP) is a patented proprietary transport layer protocol that is designed to transparently replace TCP in order to overcome inefficiencies in the design of TCP related to wireless data transport. It is owned by Venturi Wireless.
The protocol is employed by various wireless broadband internet service providers such as Verizon Wireless and Unwired (Unwired calls the Venturi Client application that provides transparent VTP connectivity the Unwired Optimizer) in order to speed up their network and to overcome latency issues.

External links
  Venturi Wireless Solutions: Broadband Services - Optimization Technology
  Unwired Optimizer FAQ

Internet protocols
Transport layer protocols
Wireless networking